Euptelea pleiosperma is a species of plant in the family Eupteleaceae. It is found in China, India, and Myanmar.

References

External links
short description of Euptelea pleiosperma
photograph and short description of Euptelea pleiosperma
photograph of Euptelea pleiosperma

Ranunculales
Plants described in 1864
Least concern plants
Taxonomy articles created by Polbot
Taxa named by Joseph Dalton Hooker